Dejan Prešiček (born 21 December 1970 in Celje) is a Slovenian saxophonist and politician.

He graduated from the Music Academy in Frankfurt and continued his studies at Jean-Marie Londeix's master class in Bordeaux where he won the gold medal and the prize of the city of Bordeaux for saxophone and for chamber music.

At the "international Pierre Lantier competition" in Paris he won the 3rd Grand Prix for chamber music.

Besides being a member of the Slavko Osterc Trio and Ensemble “4Saxess”, he also performed at several festivals as a soloist or a member of chamber groups (Festival Ljubljana, Ludwigsburger Schlossfestspiele, Musica Strasbourg, Ars Nova Mainz, Nova Antiqua Köln, Musika Viva München, Warsaw Autumn, etc.) and in concert halls in Europe (London, Paris, Berlin, Vienna, Lisbon, Belgrade, Zagreb etc.), Canada, the USA, Thailand and Brazil.

As a solo artist he performed with the Slovenian Philharmonic Orchestra, the Thailand Philharmonic Orchestra, the Symphonic Orchestra of the RTV Slovenija, the Celje String Orchestra, the Slavko Osterc Ensemble and with the Soloists of the Belgrade Philharmonic Orchestra.

He has recorded for various radio and television houses (BBC London, Bayerischer Rundfunk, Deutschlandradio, SWR Stuttgart, SWR Baden Baden, Radio Lisboa, Poljski radio, RTV Slovenija, etc.) and has participated in recording numerous CDs.

He also collaborates with the following ensembles and orchestras as an outside colleague: Ensemble Modern  Frankfurt, Ensemble Aventure  Freiburg, Radio Orchestra SWF Stuttgart, RTV Slovenija, Mannheim Opera, Frankfurt Opera, Heidelberg Opera, Darmstadt Opera, Karlsruhe Opera, members of the Strasbourg Symphonic Orchestra, Slovenska filharmonija, etc.

He has collaborated with the following composers: Nenad Firšt, Vinko Globokar, Uroš Krek, Milko Lazar, Lojze Lebic, Urska Pompe, Uros Rojko, Primož Ramovš, Larisa Vrhunc, Mark-Anthony Turnage (England), Christian Loba (France), Francois Rosset (France), Klaus Obermaier (Austria), etc., and has performed debuts of their works.

He works with the world-renowned saxophonists Vincent David, Claude Delangle, Matjaz Drevensek, Jean Yves Formeau, Daniel Gauthier, Phillip Geiss, Jean-Marie Londeix, Oto Vrhovnik, Zagreb Saxophone Quartet, Bohemia Saxophone Quartet, etc.

He lectures at international summer schools (Musical Summer at Podsreda Castle, Musical Summer School “Celeia” in Celje,  International Summer School Alpe, Adrija, Donava) and takes part as member of the jury at Slovenian and international competitions (Bayreuth, Dinant, Nova Gorica, Münster…).

From 2001 he is the co-founder of the Slavko Osterc Ensemble. 2010 he was elected as president of the Slovenian Saxophone association “GD Saksofonija”.

Dejan Prešiček is the director and teacher for saxophone and chamber music at the Conservatory for music and ballet Ljubljana. Since 2009 he is honorary professor for saxophone at the University for music in Ljubljana.

Dejan Prešicek plays Selmer Saxophones, Rico reeds and BG ligatures.

Prešiček is also a politician and a member of the Social Democrats. He was the Minister of Culture in the 13th Government of Slovenia under the leadership of then Prime Minister Marjan Šarec.

His sister is classical pianist Nina Prešiček.

References 

1970 births
Living people
Musicians from Celje
Slovenian saxophonists
21st-century saxophonists